Attack of the Killer Potatoes is a 1997 science-fiction children's story by Peter Lerangis. Its title spoofs the 1978 film, Attack of the Killer Tomatoes, and the film's sequels. The book's tagline reads, "Lock the doors, close the windows, warn the neighbors...". The book was published by the children's publishing division of Scholastic Press, Apple Paperback.

Plot
The story tells of several potatoes exposed to chemicals. The chemicals cause the potatoes to rapidly grow in size, become clever and sapient, and begin an attack on humanity. In essence, the book is a parody of the creature-feature films of the 1950s, combined with the oddball satire of Attack of the Killer Tomatoes.

Reception
Reception was mostly mixed. Critics felt it was a fun but nonsensical children's book.

See also
 Attack of the Killer Tomatoes
 Help! I'm Trapped...
 Return of the Killer Tomatoes
 Killer Tomatoes Strike Back
 Killer Tomatoes Eat France

Resources
Attack of the Killer Potatoes on Epinions

1997 novels
Fictional tubers
Attack of the Killer Tomatoes